The Royal Navy Submarine School trains non-officer submariners and is located at  at Torpoint in Cornwall. In 2017 a plan to relocate the school to HMNB Clyde was announced.

See also
Submarine Command Course, The Perisher

References

Education in Cornwall
Royal Navy Submarine Service
Training establishments of the Royal Navy